The Silent Spy is the 29th installment in the Nancy Drew point-and-click adventure game series by Her Interactive. The game is available for play on Microsoft Windows and Mac OS X platforms. It has an ESRB rating of E for moments of mild violence and peril. Players take on the first-person view of fictional amateur sleuth Nancy Drew and must solve the mystery through interrogation of suspects, solving puzzles, and discovering clues. There are two levels of gameplay, Amateur and Master sleuth modes, each offering a different difficulty level of puzzles and hints, however neither of these changes affect the actual plot of the game. The game is loosely based on a book entitled The Clue of the Whistling Bagpipes (1964).

Plot
Nearly a decade ago Agent Kate Drew left home to neutralize a biochemical weapon in Scotland. While her assignment was a success, Kate died in a car accident. Or so we were told. Now the echoes of a similar plot reverberate and it's up to you, as detective Nancy Drew, to thwart the sleeper cell and expose the truth about your mother's tragic demise.

Development

Characters
Nancy Drew - Nancy is an 18-year-old amateur detective from the fictional town of River Heights in the United States. She is the only playable character in the game, which means the player must solve the mystery from her perspective.
Bridget Shaw - A native of Scotland, Bridget Shaw may be the friendliest person you meet in Glasgow. Her vast knowledge of the area and insights into current events may be helpful, but could her pleasant personality be a façade?
Ewan MacLeod - Your main contact at Cathedral. He's here to assist you in your mission to uncover what transpired during Kate Drew's final days. While Ewan may be the eyes and ears around here, can you completely trust him?
Moira Chisholm - Moira Chisholm was a close confidant to Kate Drew. Her memory and personal knowledge about Kate will unlock vital information. But could there be a secret Moira doesn't want you to know about?
Alec Fell - Alec Fell is the first person you meet after an incident at the train station. His tracking skills could help you in your case. However, remember that he may know more about you than you are led to believe.
Kate Drew - Nancy's mother who was killed in a car accident... or so you've been told. Her secrets are begging to be revealed, but your life and the lives around you could be in great danger if you reveal the truth. Can you uncover the real story and survive?

Cast
Nancy Drew / Kate Drew - Lani Minella
Alec Fell - Jeff Allen Pierce
Bridget Shaw / Zoe Wolfe - Julia Stockton
Moira Chisholm - Sofia Rybin
Ewan MacLeod - Chris Jaech
Carson Drew - Ken Boynton
Ned Nickerson - Scott Carty
Bess Marvin - Jennifer Pratt
Young Nancy Drew - Claire Boynton
Scientist - Scott Tengelin
Additional Voices - Tim Burke, Jayme Crandall, Josh Crandall, Calina Joyce, Jami Moravetz, Stuart Moulder, Lara Snyder, Alex Yopp, Carol King

Release
The game was released on October 15, 2013, though pre-orders began on September 16, 2013. Special editions of the game, which included bonus games, phone charms, outtakes, and audio tracks were sent out to those who pre-ordered the game directly from Her Interactive.

References

 

 

2013 video games
Detective video games
Video games based on Nancy Drew
Point-and-click adventure games
Spy video games
Video games developed in the United States
Video games set in Scotland
Video games set in Glasgow
Windows games
MacOS games
Her Interactive games
Single-player video games
North America-exclusive video games